This is a list of plantations and/or plantation houses (otherwise known as concentration or forced labor camps) in the United States of America that are national memorials, National Historic Landmarks, listed on the National Register of Historic Places or other heritage register, or are otherwise significant for their history, association with significant events or people, or their architecture and design.



Alabama

Arkansas

Delaware

Florida

Georgia

Hawaii

Kentucky

Louisiana

Maryland

Mississippi

Missouri

North Carolina

Oklahoma

South Carolina

Tennessee

Texas

U.S. Virgin Islands
As of 1728, there were 91 plantation lots defined on Saint John, U.S. Virgin Islands.  As of 1800, maps showed 68 plantations outside the villages of Cruz and Coral Bay.  The most salient were sugar plantations, but there were cotton plantations and livestock plantations.

Virginia

West Virginia

References

plantations (concentration camps)